Ewa Turska (born 23 August 1945) is a Polish-Canadian artist. Turska was born in Warsaw, Poland. Her work is included in the collections of the Musée d'art contemporain de Montréal and the National Gallery of Canada.

References

External links 

1945 births
20th-century Polish women artists
21st-century Polish women artists
20th-century Canadian women artists
21st-century Canadian women artists
Polish emigrants to Canada
Living people